Flaming Guns is a 1932 American Western film directed by Arthur Rosson and written by Jack Cunningham. The film stars Tom Mix, William Farnum, Ruth Hall, Clarence Wilson, George Hackathorne and Duke R. Lee. The film was released on December 22, 1932, by Universal Pictures. It was based on a story by Peter B. Kyne.

Cast 
Tom Mix as Tom Malone
William Farnum as Henry Ramsey
Ruth Hall as Mary Ramsey
Clarence Wilson as J.P. Mulford 
George Hackathorne as Hugh
Duke R. Lee as Red McIntyre 
Gilbert Holmes as Ranch hand Pee Wee 
Tony Jr. the Horse as Tony

Plot
Malone is "a cloddish sort who avoids using firearms whenever possible". Mary Ramsey's parents dislike her romance with Malone, so the two elope.

References

External links 
 

1932 films
American Western (genre) films
1932 Western (genre) films
Universal Pictures films
Films directed by Arthur Rosson
American black-and-white films
1930s English-language films
1930s American films